Portage County is a county in the U.S. state of Ohio. As of the 2020 census, the population was 161,791. Located in Northeast Ohio, Portage County is part of the Akron Metropolitan Statistical Area, which is also included in the Cleveland–Akron–Canton Combined Statistical Area. Its county seat is Ravenna and its largest city is Kent.

The county, named for the portage between the Cuyahoga and Tuscarawas Rivers, was created in 1807 and formally organized in 1808. In addition to the cities of Kent and Ravenna, Portage County also includes the cities of Aurora and Streetsboro, along with five villages, 18 civil townships, and several unincorporated places within those townships. Additionally, the county includes parts of the city of Tallmadge, and part of the village of Mogadore, both of which are mostly in neighboring Summit County.

History
The name "Portage" comes from an old Indian path called "Portage Path", which ran between the Cuyahoga and Tuscarawas rivers, where travelers portaged their canoes.  The location of the trail today is within the boundaries of neighboring Summit County.

After the discovery of the New World, the land that became Portage County was originally part of the French colony of Canada (New France), which was ceded in 1763 to Great Britain and renamed the Province of Quebec. In the late 18th century the land became part of the Connecticut Western Reserve in the Northwest Territory, then was purchased by the Connecticut Land Company in 1795.

The first European settler in what is now Portage County was Abraham Honey in 1798 in the area now known as Mantua Township, followed by Asa Hall in what is now Atwater Township in April 1799.  In June 1799, Benjamin Tappan, Jr. arrived and founded Ravenna, David Daniels came to what is now Palmyra Township, and Ebenezer Sheldon settled in what is now Aurora. A family group of Huguenot refugees also eventually migrated to Portage County by 1804.

When first settled, the area that presently constitutes Portage County was part of the original Jefferson County, which had been organized in 1797.  In 1800, the area was made part of Trumbull County, which followed the boundaries of the Connecticut Western Reserve. In 1802, all of what is now Portage County was organized under the name of Franklin Township with other townships being formed later.  On February 10, 1807 the Ohio state legislature passed the act to create Portage County from Trumbull County and it took effect June 7, 1807.  Portage County remained attached to Trumbull County until June 8, 1808, when the first elections were held.  Initially, the county included a large area of the Western Reserve that encompassed most of present-day Summit County, all of Medina and Huron counties, and parts of Lorain and Ashland counties.  There were six organized townships in 1808: Franklin, Deerfield, Aurora, Hiram, Springfield, and Hudson with new townships organized later, reaching a maximum of 30.  The present-day boundaries of Portage County were established in 1840 following the 1812 creation of Medina County, a slight boundary adjustment in 1827 with Cuyahoga County, and finally the creation of Summit County in 1840, which took 10 townships from Portage County along with 3 townships from Medina County and two from Stark County.

Geography

West Branch State Park is a very large state park in central Portage County, consisting of a large green surrounding the Michael J. Kirwan Dam and Reservoir. There are a number of smaller state and local parks.

Adjacent counties
 Geauga County (north)
 Trumbull County (east)
 Mahoning County (southeast)
 Stark County (south)
 Summit County (west)
 Cuyahoga County (northwest)

Major highways

Demographics

2000 census
As of the census of 2000, there were 152,061 people, 56,449 households, and 39,175 families living in the county. The population density was 309 people per square mile (119/km2). There were 60,096 housing units at an average density of 122 per square mile (47/km2). The racial makeup of the county was 94.40% White, 3.18% Black or African American, 0.18% Native American, 0.82% Asian, 0.01% Pacific Islander, 0.22% from other races, and 1.19% from two or more races. 0.72% of the population were Hispanic or Latino of any race. 23.5% were of German, 11.0% Irish, 9.9% Italian, 9.7% English, 9.7% American and 5.2% Polish ancestry according to Census 2000. 96.1% spoke English and 1.2% Spanish as their first language.

There were 56,449 households, out of which 32.30% had children under the age of 18 living with them, 55.60% were married couples living together, 10.10% had a female householder with no husband present, and 30.60% were non-families. 23.30% of all households were made up of individuals, and 7.40% had someone living alone who was 65 years of age or older. The average household size was 2.56 and the average family size was 3.03.

In the county, the population was spread out, with 23.70% under the age of 18, 14.30% from 18 to 24, 28.60% from 25 to 44, 22.30% from 45 to 64, and 11.00% who were 65 years of age or older. The median age was 34 years. For every 100 females there were 95.40 males. For every 100 females age 18 and over, there were 92.40 males.

The median income for a household in the county was $44,347, and the median income for a family was $52,820. Males had a median income of $37,434 versus $26,232 for females. The per capita income for the county was $20,428. About 5.90% of families and 9.30% of the population were below the poverty line, including 9.90% of those under age 18 and 5.70% of those age 65 or over.

Using the Gini coefficient to measure household inequality, Portage County received a .43 in 2012. In 2013 16.1% of the population, or 25,196 people, were poor or impoverished. The county saw an increase in its poor population, as this can be compared to a 9.3% poverty rate (13,395 people) in 1999.

2010 census
As of the 2010 United States Census, there were 161,419 people, 62,222 households, and 40,757 families living in the county. The racial makeup of the county was 92.3% white, 4.1% black or African American, 1.4% Asian, 0.2% American Indian, 0.3% from other races, and 1.7% from two or more races. Those of Hispanic or Latino origin made up 1.3% of the population. In terms of ancestry, 30.7% were German, 17.1% were Irish, 11.5% were English, 11.0% were Italian, 6.6% were Polish, and 5.7% were American.

Of the 62,222 households, 29.6% had children under the age of 18 living with them, 50.1% were married couples living together, 10.9% had a female householder with no husband present, 34.5% were non-families, and 25.4% of all households were made up of individuals. The average household size was 2.47 and the average family size was 2.96. The median age was 37.4 years.

The median income for a household in the county was $50,447 and the median income for a family was $65,306. Males had a median income of $46,014 versus $34,250 for females. The per capita income for the county was $25,097. About 8.1% of families and 13.5% of the population were below the poverty line, including 16.2% of those under age 18 and 4.4% of those age 65 or over.

Politics

Following a trend seen throughout large parts of Ohio, in 2016 Donald Trump won Portage County by 9.87 points and then again in 2020 by 12.44 points, becoming the first Republican in almost three decades to win the county, the last time being George H. W. Bush in 1988.

|}

Education
The county is served by multiple public school districts, private schools, and public libraries, and is home to two institutions of higher education.

Libraries

The Portage County Library Consortium is a library consortium consisting of Kent Free Library in Kent, Reed Memorial Library in Ravenna, and the five branches of the Portage County Library District, which are located in Aurora, Garrettsville, Randolph, Streetsboro, and Windham. The consortium allows patrons of any member library to use their library card at another consortium location or request materials housed at another library. Through the SearchOhio database, the consortium is connected to OhioLINK, which provides local access to the State Library of Ohio and dozens of university and college libraries across the state.

The county is also home to the Kent State University Libraries in Kent, an academic library system with a collection of over 2.5 million volumes. The KSU system, one of three members of the Association of Research Libraries in Ohio, includes the 12-story main library and individual libraries for architecture, fashion, performing arts, and maps, on the main campus in Kent. It also includes individual libraries at each of the university's seven regional campuses in Northeast Ohio.

Public school districts
Portage County is home to eleven public school districts.

In addition, there are parts of five neighboring districts which serve portions of Portage County residents.

Portage County also has two public schools that serve students from multiple districts:
 Maplewood Career Center in Ravenna, a joint vocational school for students in grades 11 and 12 from 9 of the county's school districts (all but Kent and Aurora) and Mogadore.
 Bio-Med Science Academy, a year-round public Science, Technology, Engineering, Mathematics, and Medicine (STEM+M) high school located on the campus of Northeast Ohio Medical University in Rootstown with campuses in Ravenna and Shalersville. The academy has students enrolled from Portage County and adjacent counties.

Private schools
Crossroads Christian Academy, a Christian school for grades K4–12 operated by and housed at First Baptist Church in Streetsboro
St. Joseph School, a Roman Catholic school for grades PK–8 in St. Joseph, affiliated with the Diocese of Youngstown
St. Patrick School, a Roman Catholic school for grades K–8 in Kent, affiliated with the Diocese of Youngstown
Valley Christian Academy, a Christian school for grades PK–8 in Aurora

Higher education
Portage County is home to three institutions of higher learning:
 Kent State University, located in Kent; a large regional public research university with around 40,000 students.  It serves as the county's largest employer.
 Hiram College, located in Hiram in northeastern Portage County; a small liberal arts college of around 1,200 students.
 Northeast Ohio Medical University (NEOMED), located in Rootstown, in the south-central part of the county.  It is a public medical school and a consortium of Kent State University, the University of Akron, Youngstown State University, and Cleveland State University, with colleges of medicine, pharmacy, and graduate studies.

Culture

Theater
 Kent Stage

Museums
 Kelso House Museum, Brimfield
 Kent Historical Society Museum, Kent
 Kent State University Museum, Kent
 Kent State School of Art Galleries, Kent
 Cowrie-Lowrie-Beatty Portage County Historical Society Museum, Ravenna

Media
 Record-Courier, a newspaper based in Ravenna that covers news for the entire county online and in print
 The Portager, an online news source based in Randolph that covers the entire county
 KentWired, an online news source from Kent State University independent student media outlets The Kent Stater and TV2
 Weekly Villager, online news source based in Garrettsville with news from Portage, Geauga, and Trumbull counties

Communities

Portage County is arranged as a 4x5 grid of 20 rectangles: 18 unincorporated townships containing 9 cities and villages; and two incorporated townships which are fully occupied by one city each.

Under Ohio law, there are two types of incorporated municipal jurisdictions: cities and villages, and any territory within a county that is not part of an incorporated municipality (city or village), is part of a township. Townships have limited local government and services.

Camp James A. Garfield, formerly known as the Ravenna Training and Logistics Site and commonly known as the Ravenna Arsenal, occupies much of the land in Charlestown, Paris, and Windham Townships, as well as a small part of Freedom Township.

Cities
 Aurora
 Kent
 Ravenna (county seat)
 Streetsboro
 Tallmadge

Villages
 Garrettsville
 Hiram
 Mantua
 Mogadore
 Sugar Bush Knolls
 Windham

Townships

 Atwater
 Brimfield
 Charlestown
 Deerfield
 Edinburg
 Franklin
 Freedom
 Hiram
 Mantua
 Nelson
 Palmyra
 Paris
 Randolph
 Ravenna
 Rootstown
 Shalersville
 Suffield
 Windham

Census-designated places
 Atwater in Atwater Township
 Brady Lake in Franklin Township
 Brimfield in Brimfield Township
 Suffield in Suffield Township

Unincorporated communities

 Black Horse
 Campbellsport
 Cobbs Corners
 Diamond
 Drakesburg
 Earlville
 Freedom Station
 Hiram Rapids
 Lloyd
 Mahoning
 Mishler
 Moran
 New Milford
 St. Joseph
 Twin Lakes
 Wayland
 Yale

Notable people
 Nettie Sanford Chapin (1830–1901), teacher, historian, author, newspaper publisher, suffragist
 Peter J. Barber (1830-1905), architect, known for his work in Santa Barbara, California

See also
 National Register of Historic Places listings in Portage County, Ohio
 Ohio county government

Notes

References

 https://www.record-courier.com/article/20170422/news/304229918/
 https://www.record-courier.com/news/20180830/fair-4-h-bake-saleauction/
 https://www.record-courier.com/sports/20190930/high-school-roundup--field-volleyball-wins-fifth-straight/ 
 https://www.record-courier.com/lifestyle/20170902/county-state-4-h-sewing-winners-named/

External links
 Portage County Government website
 US Census Bureau Quickfacts for Portage County, Ohio

 
1808 establishments in Ohio
Populated places established in 1808
Ohio counties in the Western Reserve